Events in the year 1389 in Norway.

Incumbents
Monarch: Eric III (along with Margaret)

Events
8 September - Eric III becomes king of Norway.

Arts and literature

Births

Deaths

References

Norway